Russell Basser (born 20 March 1960) is an Australian former water polo player who competed in the 1984 Summer Olympics.

See also
 List of Caulfield Grammar School people

References

1960 births
Living people
Australian male water polo players
Olympic water polo players of Australia
Water polo players at the 1984 Summer Olympics
Sportspeople from Melbourne